Acmoniodus is a poorly known extinct genus of Holocephalian fish from the Devonian period. It is known only by a singular species described from the lower Frasnian-aged Geneseo Shale of New York (state): A. clarkei.

References 

Holocephali
Prehistoric fish genera
Late Devonian fish
Paleontology in New York (state)